Fusconaia burkei is a species of freshwater mussel, an aquatic bivalve mollusk in the family Unionidae, the river mussels.

This species is endemic to North America.

Original description 
This species, originally called Quincuncina burkei, was first described by Bryant Walker in 1922.

Walkers's original text (the type description) reads as follows:

Quincuncina burkei Walker. Plate I, figs. 1 and 4.

Shell of moderate size, subrhomboid, very inequilateral, 
subsolid, somewhat inflated; beaks only slightly elevated above the 
hinge-line, their sculpture consisting of strong, subcircular 
ridges, stronger along the umbonal ridge and curved up sharply 
behind, fading out anteriorly and becoming nearly parallel with 
the growth-lines; anterior end regularly rounded; base line 
curved; posterior end somewhat produced, subtruncate, curving 
down rather abruptly and subangulated as it approaches the 
posterior point, which is below the median of the disk; 
posterior ridge strong and angulated by the junction of the surface 
ridges; posterior slope with strong ridges, curving upwards, 
extending from the posterior ridge to the posterior margin, these 
form a sharp angle on the posterior ridge with heavier ridges 
extending downward and forward, which become more or less 
broken and tuberculous toward the margin and much weaker 
on the anterior end where they assume a rather quincuncial 
arrangement; epidermis in mature shells black or sometimes 
dark brown, in young shells brown or occasionally 
greenish-yellow, in which case obscure radial stripes of darker green are 
visible; pseudocardinals double in both valves; in the right 
valve the anterior is low and oblique, the posterior strong and 
erect; in the left valve the anterior is rather long and projects 
obliquely forward, the posterior is larger, erect and more or less 
split up; the laterals, two in the left valve and (usually) one in 
the right are only a little curved, that in the right valve is 
sometimes more or less inclined to be double; beak cavities not 
very deep nor compressed; anterior muscle scars well marked, 
the superior one deep and extending under the base of the 
anterior pseudocardinal; posterior muscle scars distinct, but not 
deeply impressed; nacre light purplish, deeper in the beak 
cavities and iridescent behind.

Length 51.4, height 31.5, diam. 18.5 mm.

Type locality, Sikes' Creek, a tributary of the Choctahatchee River,
Barbour County, Ala. Also in the Choctahatchee River, 
Blue Springs; Pea River at Elamville, Clio and Flemings' Mill 
and Campbell's Creek near Clio, Barbour County, and 
Hurricane Creek, near Hartford, Geneva County, Ala.

Type, No. 41626, Coll. Walker. Cotypes in the Alabama State Museum and the Carnegie Museum.

This very distinct species was first discovered in the Pea River at Elamville, Ala., by Joseph B. Burke and is named 
after him by the request of the late H. H. Smith.

So far as known it is restricted to the Choctahatchee drainage 
system.

There is some variation in shape and considerable in 
sculpture shown in the series from the several localities listed above. 
As shown by the figure the type is quite distinctly biangulated 
at the posterior extremity, but in many specimens the upper 
angle disappears and the dorsal outline curves directly down to 
a sharp posterior point. The surface sculpture is some times 
nearly obsolete. This is quite marked in the shells from 
Hurricane Creek and the Pea River at Clio. On the other hand the 
series from Campbell's Creek are larger and have a much coarser 
sculpture than any of the other lots. The largest specimen 
seen is in this lot and measures 67.5 × 38 × 23 mm.

The species is extremely subject to erosion and for this reason 
the type was selected from the series from Sikes' Creek, which 
were in much better condition than those from the 
Choctahatchee, which supplied the alcoholic material on which the 
generic diagnosis is based.

The description of the beak sculpture is based on a single 
young shell from the Pea River, which is nearly in perfect condition.

As stated in the generic diagnosis the affinities of this species 
lie clearly with U. infucatus Con. and U. kleinianus Lea. It 
differs from both in its more elongated shape and less 
compressed beak cavities. But the peculiar surface sculpture is the same in all.

References

burkei
Molluscs described in 1922
ESA threatened species